The Dragon was a sailing event in the sailing program of the 1956 Summer Olympics, held on Port Phillip. Seven races were scheduled. Fifty sailors, on 16 boats, from 16 nations competed.

Results 

DNF = Did Not Finish, DNS= Did Not Start, DSQ = Disqualified 
 = Male,  = Female

Daily standings

Conditions on Port Phillip 
Of the total of three race areas were needed during the Olympics in the Port Phillip Bay. Each of the classes was using the same scoring system. The center course was used for the Dragon.

Notes

References 
 
 
 

Dragon
Dragon (keelboat) competitions